A Yank in Rome is a 1946 Italian comedy film directed by Luigi Zampa and starring Valentina Cortese.

Cast
 Valentina Cortese as Maria, La maestrina
 Andrea Checchi as Roberto
 Leo Dale as Dick
 Adolfo Celi as Tom
 Paolo Stoppa as Sor Augusto
 Elli Parvo as Elena
 Giovanni Dolfini as Don Giuseppe
 Felice Minotti as Il padre di Roberto
 Gino Baghetti as Monsignor Caligaris
 Anna Maria Padoan as La signorina Paolina
 Arturo Bragaglia as Il sacrestano
 Oreste Fares as Il portiere di casa Caligaris
 Luciano Salce as L'ufficiale americano
 Elettra Druscovich as La contessina Arcieri
 Achille Ponzi as Pietro, il cameriere

References

External links

1946 films
1946 comedy films
Italian comedy films
Italian black-and-white films
1940s Italian-language films
Films scored by Nino Rota
Films set in Rome
Films directed by Luigi Zampa
Films produced by Carlo Ponti
1940s Italian films